Henry "Son" Sims (August 22, 1890 – December 23, 1958) was an American Delta blues fiddler and songwriter. He is best known as an accompanist for Charley Patton and the young Muddy Waters.

Life and career
Sims was born in Anguilla, Mississippi, the only son of five children. He learned to play the fiddle from his grandfather. Sims served with the US Army in France during World War I.

Sims went on to be the leader of the Mississippi Corn Shuckers, a rural string ensemble, and played with them for a number of years. He joined his childhood friend Charley Patton in a recording session for Paramount Records in Grafton, Wisconsin, in June 1929. Sims accompanied Patton on fiddle on thirteen tracks, including "Elder Greene Blues", "Going to Move to Alabama" and "Devil Sent the Rain Blues"; and recorded four of his own songs, including "Tell Me Man Blues", his best-known composition, and "Farrell Blues". He played alongside Patton at times until the Patton's death in 1934, when Sims returned to working on a plantation. By then he could also play the mandolin, guitar and piano.

On August 28, 1941, Sims accompanied Muddy Waters in a recording session under the direction of Alan Lomax, as part of his recordings for the Library of Congress. In the 1940s, Sims also accompanied Robert Nighthawk on several occasions. He continued a solo career into the 1950s.

Sims died following renal surgery in December 1958 in Memphis, Tennessee, at the age of 68. He was buried in an unmarked grave in Bell Grove Baptist Church Cemetery, in Clarksdale, Mississippi.

Recordings

Singles
Henry "Son" Sims (vocals), Patton accompanying guitar

Compilation album appearances

With Muddy Waters
The Complete Plantation Recordings (Chess, 1941–42, [1993])

See also
List of Delta blues musicians

Further reading
Calt, Stephen; Wardlow, Gayle (1988). King of the Delta Blues: The Life and Music of Charlie Patton. .
Palmer, Robert (1995). Deep Blues. .

References

1890 births
1958 deaths
American fiddlers
Delta blues musicians
Paramount Records artists
Songwriters from Mississippi
Blues musicians from Mississippi
People from Anguilla, Mississippi
20th-century American violinists